William Lee (1563–1614) was an English clergyman and inventor who devised the first stocking frame knitting machine in 1589, the only one in use for centuries. Its principle of operation remains in use.

Lee was born in the village of Calverton, Nottinghamshire. He entered Christ's College, Cambridge in 1579 as a sizar and graduated from St. John's College in 1582.

Stocking frame knitting machine 

Lee was a curate at Calverton when he is said to have developed the machine because a woman whom he was courting showed more interest in knitting than in him (or alternatively that his wife was a very slow knitter). His first machine produced a coarse wool, for stockings. Refused a patent by Queen Elizabeth I, he built an improved machine that increased the number of needles per inch from 8 to 20 and produced a silk of finer texture, but the queen again denied him a patent because of her concern for the employment security of the kingdom's many hand knitters whose livelihood might be threatened by such mechanization.  The queen said to Lee:  "Thou aimest high, Master Lee. Consider thou what the invention could do to my poor subjects.  It would assuredly bring to them ruin by depriving them of employment, thus making them beggars."  Most likely the Queen’s concern was a manifestation of the hosiers’ guilds' fear that the invention would make the skills of its artisan members obsolete.

He entered into a partnership agreement with one George Brooke on 6 June 1600, but the unfortunate Brooks was arrested on a charge of treason and executed in 1603. Eventually, he moved to France with his brother James, taking 9 workmen and 9 frames. He found better support from the Huguenot Henry IV of France, who granted him a patent. Lee began stocking manufacture in Rouen, France, and prospered until, shortly before Henry's assassination in 1610, he signed a contract with Pierre de Caux to provide knitting machines for the manufacture of silk and wool stockings. But the climate changed abruptly on the king's death and despite moving to Paris, his claims were ignored and he died in distress in 1614.

After Lee's death, his brother James returned to England and disposed of most of the frames in London before moving to Thoroton, near Nottingham where Lee's apprentice John Aston (or Ashton), a miller, had continued to work on the frame and produced a number of improvements. This led to the establishment of two knitting centres, one in London and one in Nottingham. During the 18th century Leicester vied with Nottingham for leadership of the industry in the English East Midlands.

Although the industry took nearly a century to develop in wool, silk and lace, the machinery that he developed remained the backbone for far longer and this is reflected in his appearance in the coat of arms of The Worshipful Company of Framework Knitters. The Quatercentenary of the invention was celebrated in 1989 by the publication of a book of historical studies.

Notes

References

External links
 Calverton, Woodborough and Lambley, Nottinghamshire history
 Painting of Lee

1560s births
1614 deaths
16th-century English Anglican priests
17th-century English clergy
Alumni of St John's College, Cambridge
English inventors
People from Calverton, Nottinghamshire
People in knitting
Textile workers